John Wesley Beckett (January 5, 1892 – July 26, 1981) was an American football player and coach and United States Marine Corps officer. He played college football as a tackle at University of Oregon and for the Mare Island Marines. Beckett was inducted into the College Football Hall of Fame as a player in 1972.

Early life
Born in rural northeastern Oregon, Beckett attended Eugene High School in Eugene before enrolling at the University of Oregon.

University of Oregon
Although primarily used as an tackle, Beckett excelled at several positions, occasionally playing halfback and punter. Beckett was the team captain in his senior year of 1916 and was named to the all-Pacific Coast Conference team. He led the team to an undefeated record and tie for the conference championship with the University of Washington. Oregon was chosen to represent the conference in the 1917 Rose Bowl where they defeated Pennsylvania, 14–0, with Beckett later named the game's most valuable player.

U.S. Marine Corps service
With the United States' entry in World War I, Beckett joined the Marines in his senior year, and was assigned to the Marine base at Mare Island Naval Shipyard in Vallejo, California. He joined the Mare Island football team, coached by Beckett's Oregon coach Hugo Bezdek, and was selected as team captain. With the U.S. at war, the 1918 Rose Bowl featured two service teams: Beckett's Mare Island team and the U.S. Army's Camp Lewis team, with Mare Island winning, 19–7. Beckett is the only person to have been the captain of two different Rose Bowl teams.

Beckett served 50 years in the Marines, coaching Marine teams at Mare Island, Quantico, and San Diego, amassing an overall coaching record of 56–19–3. He achieved a final rank of brigadier general.

Professional career
Beckett also spent two seasons in the National Football League (NFL) with the Buffalo All-Americans and Columbus Panhandles.

Legacy
Beckett was named to the College Football Hall of Fame in 1972, and was a charter member of both the University of Oregon Athletic Hall of Fame in 1992, and the Oregon Sports Hall of Fame in 1980. He died in La Jolla, California, in 1981.

Head coaching record

References

External links
 
 

1892 births
1981 deaths
American football halfbacks
American football tackles
Buffalo All-Americans players
Columbus Panhandles players
Navy Midshipmen football coaches
Mare Island Marines football coaches
Oregon Ducks football players
Quantico Marines Devil Dogs football coaches
College Football Hall of Fame inductees
United States Marine Corps generals
United States Marine Corps personnel of World War I
South Eugene High School alumni
Sportspeople from Eugene, Oregon
People from Morrow County, Oregon
Coaches of American football from Oregon
Players of American football from Oregon
Military personnel from Oregon